New York English describes the varieties of English spoken within New York (state), the most well-known of which is perhaps New York City English.

New York English, the New York dialect or the New York accent may refer to:

New York City English, a regional dialect that is spoken by many people in New York City and much of its surrounding metropolitan area

Inland Northern American English, a dialect spanning especially between Western and Central New York

Other varieties located within regions of New York such as the Leatherstocking Region, Capital District, North Country and Long Island
It may also refer to New York City Latino English, a Hispanic American ethnolect originating in New York City, also referred to as the East Coast Latino accent.

See also
 New York (disambiguation)
 List of dialects of the English language, a list of varieties which differ in pronunciation, vocabulary and grammar